Colfax County is a county in the U.S. state of Nebraska. As of the 2010 United States Census, the population was 10,515. Its county seat is Schuyler. The county and its seat are named after US Vice President (1869-1873) Schuyler Colfax.

In the Nebraska license plate system, Colfax County is represented by the prefix 43 (it had the 43rd largest number of vehicles registered in the county when the license plate system was established in 1922).

History
Colfax County was established by the Nebraska legislature in 1869, as part of the division of Platte County into three parts. The new county was named for Schuyler Colfax, then the Vice-President of the United States. The site of Shell Creek Station on the Union Pacific Railroad was chosen as the county seat, and renamed Schuyler also after Colfax. Schuyler was incorporated in 1870, and the county's first courthouse was constructed in 1872.

Colfax County in May 2020 had the sixth-highest per capita COVID-19 infection rate of any American county. About one of every 23 residents has tested positive, with 467 cases. As of October 2020, one in every 13 residents has tested positive, with 798 cases.

Geography

Major highways

  U.S. Highway 30
  Nebraska Highway 15
  Nebraska Highway 57
  Nebraska Highway 91

Adjacent counties

 Dodge County – east
 Butler County – south
 Platte County – west
 Stanton County – north
 Cuming County – northeast

Demographics

As of the 2000 United States census, there were 10,441 people, 3,682 households, and 2,592 families in the county. The population density was 25 people per square mile (10/km2). There were 4,088 housing units at an average density of 10 per square mile (4/km2). The racial makeup of the county was 81.73% White, 0.07% Black or African American, 0.19% Native American, 0.20% Asian, 0.14% Pacific Islander, 15.94% from other races, and 1.73% from two or more races. 26.17% of the population were Hispanic or Latino of any race. 28.8% were of German and 24.2% Czech ancestry.

The 2020 United States census said that the county was 47.4% non-hispanic white, 3.5% black African-American, .5% Asian and 47.2% Hispanic. 

There were 3,682 households, out of which 35.60% had children under the age of 18 living with them, 58.90% were married couples living together, 7.10% had a female householder with no husband present, and 29.60% were non-families. 25.70% of all households were made up of individuals, and 15.40% had someone living alone who was 65 years of age or older. The average household size was 2.80 and the average family size was 3.31.

The county population contained 28.90% under the age of 18, 8.50% from 18 to 24, 27.90% from 25 to 44, 18.70% from 45 to 64, and 16.00% who were 65 years of age or older. The median age was 35 years. For every 100 females there were 106.40 males. For every 100 females age 18 and over, there were 105.70 males.

The median income for a household in the county was $35,849, and the median income for a family was $40,936. Males had a median income of $25,656 versus $20,485 for females. The per capita income for the county was $15,148. About 7.20% of families and 10.80% of the population were below the poverty line, including 13.80% of those under age 18 and 7.90% of those age 65 or over.

Communities

Cities 

 Clarkson
 Schuyler (county seat)

Villages 

 Howells
 Leigh
 Richland
 Rogers

Politics
Colfax County voters are reliably Republican. In only one national election since 1936 did the county select the Democratic Party candidate.

See also
 National Register of Historic Places listings in Colfax County, Nebraska

References

 
Nebraska counties
1869 establishments in Nebraska
Populated places established in 1869